

Awards and nominations

Academy Awards

ALMA Award

BAFTA Awards

Berlin International Film Festival

Bodil Awards

British Independent Film Awards

Cannes Film Festival

Cartagena Film Festival

Cinema Brazil Grand Prize

Directors Guild of Great Britain

European Film Awards

Golden Globes Awards

Gramado Film Festival

Guadalajara International Film Festival

Havana Film Festival

Imagen Awards

International Emmy Awards

London Film Critics' Circle

Los Angeles Film Critics Association Awards

References

Meirelles, Fernando